Alfred Benjamin Butts (1890 – 1962) was an American political scientist and university administrator. He served as the Chancellor of the University of Mississippi from 1935 to 1946.

Early life
Alfred Benjamin Butts was born in 1890 in Durham, North Carolina. In 1911, he received a B.S. degree from Mississippi A&M College, now known as Mississippi State University, and a Ph.D. from Columbia University in 1920. He received a law degree from Yale Law School in 1930.

Career
From 1911 to 1935, he taught at Mississippi A&M. He served as Chancellor of the University of Mississippi from 1935 to 1946. He served as the president of the Southern Political Science Association (SPSA) in 1938.

Death
He died in 1962.

Bibliography
Public administration in Mississippi (1919)

References

External links
 

1890 births
1962 deaths
People from Durham, North Carolina
People from Mississippi
Mississippi State University alumni
Columbia University alumni
Yale Law School alumni
University of Mississippi faculty
American political scientists
20th-century American academics
20th-century political scientists